Germinal matrix hemorrhage is a bleeding into the subependymal germinal matrix with or without subsequent rupture into the lateral ventricle. Such intraventricular hemorrhage can occur due to perinatal asphyxia in preterm neonates.

Presentation 
This may lead to various neurological sequelae including presentation with cerebral palsy, mental retardation and seizures.

Pathophysiology 

The germinal matrix is the site of proliferating neuronal and glial precursors in the developing brain, which is located above the caudate nucleus, in the floor of the lateral ventricle, and caudothalamic groove. The germinal matrix contains a rich network of fragile thin-walled blood vessels. Hence the microcirculation in this particular area is extremely sensitive to hypoxia and changes in perfusion pressure. It is most frequent before 35 weeks gestation and is typically seen in very low birth-weight (<1500g) premature infants, because they lack the ability for auto regulation of cerebral blood flow. Consequently, increased arterial blood pressure in these blood vessels leads to rupture and hemorrhage into germinal matrix.

Diagnosis

Grades 

A commonly used classification system of germinal matrix hemorrhage is the sonographic grading system proposed by Papile:
grade I - hemorrhage is confined to the germinal matrix.
grade II - intraventricular hemorrhage without ventricular dilatation
grade III - intraventricular hemorrhage with ventricular dilatation
grade IV - intraventricular rupture and hemorrhage into the surrounding white matter

In the grading system proposed by Papile the grad 4 hemorrhages results from a subependymal bleeding into the adjacent brain parenchyma.
Today however these bleedings are regarded as venous hemorrhagic infarctions. This is a result of veins compressed by the subependymal bleeding.

Prevention 
Antenatal corticosteroids have a role in reducing incidence of germinal matrix hemorrhage in premature infants.

Management
Stem cell-based therapies may help to treat germinal matrix hemorrhage in preterm babies but there is currently no reliable evidence to support their use.

See also 
 Ganglionic eminence, a part of the germinal matrix

References

External links 

Neurotrauma
Disorders causing seizures
Neonatology